The Postal Corporation of Kenya is the company responsible for postal service in Kenya. It is also known as Posta Kenya.

Kenyan post system was formerly part of the Kenya Post & Telecommunication Corporation (KP&TC), which was split into Posta, the Communication Commission of Kenya (CCK) and Telkom Kenya in 1999.

References

External links 

Communications in Kenya
Logistics companies of Kenya
Kenya
Postal system of Kenya
Philately of Kenya
1999 establishments in Kenya